Vadakarapathy is a village in the Palakkad district, state of Kerala, India. Along with some other villages, it is administered by the Vadakarapathy gram panchayat.

Demographics
 India census, Vadakarapathy had a population of 16,632 with 8,281 males and 8,351 females.

References

Vagakarapathy